Acrocercops symploca is a moth of the family Gracillariidae. It is known from Queensland, Australia.

The larvae feed on Leguminosae species. They mine the leaves of their host plant.

References

symploca
Moths of Australia
Moths described in 1913